Milton Turner (1930–1993) was a jazz drummer.

After graduating from Pearl High School, he attended Tennessee State University, where he coincided with Hank Crawford, who he later recommended to join him in Ray Charles' band when he took over from William Peeples in the late 1950s.

In 1962, he was a member of Phineas Newborn's trio with Leroy Vinnegar, on whose solo albums he would later appear, and in the early 1960s, Turner also recorded with Teddy Edwards. He never recorded as a leader.

Discography
With Ray Charles
What'd I Say (Atlantic, 1959)
The Genius Hits the Road (ABC-Paramount, 1960)
With Hank Crawford
More Soul (Atlantic, 1960)
The Soul Clinic (Atlantic, 1962)
True Blue (Atlantic, 1964)
Dig These Blues (Atlantic, 1966)
After Hours (Atlantic, 1966)
Mr. Blues (Atlantic, 1967)
With Teddy Edwards
Good Gravy! (Contemporary, 1961)
Heart & Soul (Contemporary, 1962)
With Joe Gordon
Lookin' Good! (Contempoarary, 1961) 
With Paul Horn
The Sound of Paul Horn (Columbia, 1961)
Profile of a Jazz Musician (Columbia, 1962)
With Charles Kynard
Where It's At! (Pacific Jazz, 1963) 
With Phineas Newborn, Jr.
The Great Jazz Piano of Phineas Newborn Jr. (Contemporary, 1963)
With David "Fathead" Newman
Fathead (Atlantic, 1960)
House of David (Atlantic, 1967)
With Helyne Stewart
Love Moods (Contemporary, 1961)
With Sarah Vaughan
Sarah Sings Soulfully (Roulette, 1963)
With Leroy Vinnegar
Leroy Walks Again!!! (Contemporary, 1963) 
Jazz's Great Walker (VeeJay, 1964)
With Jimmy Woods
Awakening!! (Contemporary, 1962)

References

Year of birth unknown
American jazz drummers
 
Place of birth missing
1930 births
1993 deaths
Tennessee State University alumni
20th-century American drummers
American male drummers
American male jazz musicians
20th-century American male musicians